Charles David Wendig (born April 22, 1976) is an American author, comic book writer, screenwriter, and blogger. He is best known for his online blog Terribleminds, for his 2015 Star Wars novel trilogy Aftermath, the first book of which debuted at No. 4 on The New York Times Best Seller list and No. 4 on USA Today best seller list, for which series he created the characters of Gallius Rax and marshal Cobb Vanth, the latter of whom would subsequently appear in the Disney+ series The Mandalorian and The Book of Boba Fett. Wendig has additionally written comics for Dark Circle Comics, Dynamite Entertainment, Marvel Comics, and VS Comics.

He was a finalist for the John W. Campbell Award for Best New Writer in 2013.

Early life
Wendig grew up in New Hope, Pennsylvania. He studied English and religion at Queens University of Charlotte and graduated in 1998. After working various odd jobs and publishing early works under the name C.D. Wendig and C. David Wendig, he became a full-time freelance author writing under the name Chuck Wendig.

Career

Game writing 
Before writing fiction professionally, Wendig worked as a freelance RPG writer for over a decade. Wendig has contributed over two million words to the pen-and-paper roleplaying game industry. He has worked as a writer and developer for roleplaying games, contributing to many White Wolf projects from 2002 to 2011, including Hunter: The Vigil (2008).

Wendig is part of the advisory board of Storium, an online storytelling game by Protagonist Labs that launched a successful Kickstarter campaign and raised over $250,000.

Screenwriting 
Wendig co-wrote the Emmy-nominated interactive transmedia project Collapsus with Lance Weiler.

Along with writing partner Weiler, Wendig was selected for the 2010 Sundance Screenwriter's Lab for their feature film HiM. HiM is being produced by Ted Hope, Christine Vachon, and Anne Carey. His short film, Pandemic 41.410806, −75.654259, co-written and directed by Weiler, was selected for the 2011 Sundance Short Film Program. At one point, Wendig and Weiler were also developing television pilot for TNT with Marshall Herskovitz and Edward Zwick, but the network decided to pass.

He also contributed to David Cronenberg's transmedia production Body/Mind/Change, in which Weiler served as Creative Director.

Early novels 
Wendig's first short story collection, Irregular Creatures, was published in January 2011.

In November 2011 followed Wendig's debut novel, Double Dead, published by Abaddon Books as part of its shared-world series Tomes of the Dead. Bad Blood, a sequel novella, was published in May 2012. The books were later collected as The Complete Double Dead, released in February 2016.

Wendig participated in the Evil Hat Productions Kickstarter, which raised money for a trilogy of novels penned by Wendig based on the Spirit of the Century RPG game. After a successful campaign, he went on to release Dinocalypse Now in 2012 and Beyond Dinocalypse in 2013. Though slated to write the third (and final) volume of the Dinocalypse trilogy, Dinocalypse Forever, Wendig was unable finish the novel due to other commitments and was replaced by novelist Carrie Harris.

For Abaddon, he also penned Unclean Spirits, out in May 2013, the first installment of the Gods and Monsters series.

Miriam Black  and Mookie Pearl 
The first novel in Wendig's Miriam Black series, Blackbirds, features a girl who can see the death of anyone she touches. It was published in April 2012 by Angry Robot Books. It was followed by a sequel, Mockingbird, in August 2012. Also from Angry Robot, Wendig released The Blue Blazes in May 2013, the first novel in a new urban fantasy series following Mookie Pearl. The third book in the Miriam Black series, The Cormorant, was published in December 2013.

The Miriam Black books were optioned as a television series by Starz in 2014, to be developed by John Shiban, writer and producer of Breaking Bad and The X-Files, with a writers' room already set up. Wendig announced on his blog in November 2015 that Starz was no longer developing the adaptation.

In October 2014, Saga Press bought six books in Wendig's Miriam Black series, including the first three novels, previously published by Angry Robot Books. The first three books, Blackbirds, Mockingbird, and The Cormorant were re-published with new covers in 2015. Thunderbird, book four, followed in 2017, with The Raptor & The Wren and Vultures, books five and six, published in 2018 and 2019 respectively.

In October 2015, Wendig re-released The Blue Blazes, as well as self-publishing a sequel, The Hellsblood Bride, after contract disputes with previous publisher Angry Robot. He has stated that a third book, possibly titled A Sky Born Black or The Skyborn Bane might someday be published, should the first two books do well or be picked up by a publisher. However, Wendig said the first two books stand alone and a third book is not necessary to conclude the story.

Atlanta Burns and The Heartland trilogy 
Shotgun Gravy, a young adult novella following Atlanta Burns, described as "Veronica Mars on Adderall," was self-published by Wendig in 2011. Wendig ran a successful Kickstarter campaign during February 2012 to publish Bait Dog, a follow-up novel to Shotgun Gravy, raising $6,800, more than twice the goal. Bait Dog was self-published in 2012, and was later acquired along with Shotgun Gravy by Amazon Skyscape, and republished as Atlanta Burns in January 2015. The second book in the Atlanta Burns series, The Hunt, was published in February 2016.

In July 2013, Skyscape launched Wendig's new young adult dystopian "cornpunk" trilogy, starting with Under the Empyrean Sky. It was followed by a sequel in July 2014, called Blightborn. The Heartland trilogy concluded in July 2015 with The Harvest.

Star Wars 
It was announced in March 2015 that Wendig would write the flagship Journey to Star Wars: The Force Awakens novel, titled Star Wars: Aftermath, to be published in September 2015. The book was the first in a trilogy of new canonical Star Wars novels published by Del Rey, bridging the gap between Return of the Jedi and the new Star Wars movie, The Force Awakens. It was followed by Aftermath: Life Debt (2016) and Aftermath: Empire's End (2017). Wendig's involvement with the books came after asking to write a Star Wars licensed novel on Twitter on September 4, 2014. He was approached by LucasBooks in New York Comic Con later that year, after seeing his tweet and reading his novel Under the Empyrean Sky. Aftermath was published exactly a year later, on September 4, 2015, and debuted at No. 4 on both The New York Times Best Seller list and the USA Today best seller list. Aftermath was subject to controversy for its inclusion of a gay man as a lead character.

During the 2018 New York Comic Convention in early October 2018, Wendig announced that he would be writing a five-issue story arc with Marvel Comics entitled Shadow of Vader, which was set to begin in November 2018. The series would have explored the legacy of Darth Vader on the galaxy. Wendig was also slated to write an unannounced Star Wars book. On October 12, it was reported that Marvel had fired Wendig for unknown reasons. It was presumed the firing was the result of Wendig's social media posts. His firing resulted in the Shadow of Vader story arc being pulled from Marvel Comics' schedule.

Zer0es 
August 2015 saw the publication of Zer0es, a cyber-thriller from HarperVoyager. Invasive, a novel set in the same world as Zer0es that takes place after the events of the book, was published in 2016.

Comics 
In 2015, Archie Comics announced a new comic series written by Wendig and Adam Christopher, featuring a new version of their superhero The Shield.

Wendig was chosen in October 2015 as the writer of new Marvel ongoing comic book series Hyperion, based on the version of the character that appeared in Jonathan Hickman's run on Avengers, alongside artist Nik Virella.

During the ComicsPRO 2016 annual meeting, Marvel Comics announced a five-issue comic book adaptation of Star Wars: The Force Awakens, written by Wendig and illustrated by Luke Ross, launching in June 2016.

Blog and writing advice 
Wendig has run his blog Terribleminds since 2000, where he dispenses regular writing advice. Much of his writing advice has been collected in his self-published e-books or his book The Kickass Writer, published in 2013 by Writer's Digest Books.

Personal life 
As of 2021, Chuck Wendig lives in Pennsylvania with his family and writes for his blog terribleminds.com.

Bibliography

Middle grade fiction 
 Dust & Grim (2021)

Young adult fiction

Atlanta Burns series 
 Atlanta Burns (2015)
 The Hunt (2016)
Atlanta Burns was previously self-published in two volumes, the novella Shotgun Gravy (2011), and the follow-up novel Bait Dog (2012).

The Heartland trilogy 
 Under the Empyrean Sky (2013)
 Blightborn (2014)
 The Harvest (2015)
A short story titled "The Wind Has Teeth Tonight" was released in 2014 and takes place between the first and second book.

Fiction

Miriam Black series 
 Blackbirds (2012)
 Mockingbird (2012)
 The Cormorant (2013)
 Thunderbird (2017)
 The Raptor & The Wren (2018)
 Vultures (2019)
A bridging novelette titled "Interlude: Swallow" was released in 2015 in the anthology Three Slices, featuring work by Wendig, Delilah S. Dawson, and Kevin Hearne. It takes place between the third and fourth book.

Mookie Pearl series 
 The Blue Blazes (2013)
 The Hellsblood Bride (2015)

Zer0es series 
 Zer0es (2015)
 Invasive (2016)

Wanderers series 
 Wanderers (2019)
 Wayward (2022)

Standalone Novels 
The Book of Accidents (2021)

Tie-in fiction

Dinocalypse trilogy 
 Dinocalypse Now (2012)
 Beyond Dinocalypse (2013)

Gods and Monsters series 
 Unclean Spirits (2013)

Star Wars: Aftermath trilogy 
 Aftermath (2015)
 Aftermath: Life Debt (2016)
 Aftermath: Empire's End (2017)
The Aftermath trilogy explores the events between the films Return of the Jedi and The Force Awakens, introducing the characters of Gallius Rax and marshal Cobb Vanth, the latter of whom would subsequently appear in the Disney+ series The Mandalorian and The Book of Boba Fett.

Tomes of the Dead series 
 Double Dead (2011)
 Bad Blood (2012) (novella)
Collected as The Complete Double Dead in February 2016 by Abaddon Books.

Short fiction 
 "Bourbon Street Lullaby", Not One of Us No. 18, ed. John M. Benson (1997, as C.D. Wendig)
 "Roachboy", Whispers from the Shattered Forum No. 5, ed. Cullen Bunn (2000, as C. David Wendig)
 "Squirrely Skin", Vermin, ed. David A. Rose (2009)
 "The Moko-Jumbie Girl", Beauty Has Her Way, ed. Jennifer Brozek (2011)
 "The Toll", Human Tales, ed. Jennifer Brozek (2011)
 "Riding The Thunderbird", Tales of the Far West, ed. Gareth-Michael Skarka (2012)
 "I Want to Be a Lioness", Help Fund My Robot Army!!! and Other Improbable Crowdfunding Projects, ed. John Joseph Adams (2014)
 "The Wind Has Teeth Tonight" (2014)
 "The Forever Endeavor", serialized over 12 parts in Fireside Magazine, ed. Brian J. White (2014)
 "Big Man", Dangerous Games, ed. Jonathan Oliver (2014)
 "Queen of the Supermarket", Trouble in the Heartland, ed. Joe Clifford (2014)
 "Interlude: Swallow", Three Slices (2015)

Collections 
 Irregular Creatures (2011)

As editor 
 Don't Read This Book (2012)

Comics

Dark Circle Comics/Archie Comics 
 The Shield vol. 5 #1-#4 (with Adam Christopher and Drew Johnson, October 2015 – October 2016)

Dynamite Entertainment 
 The Sovereigns No. 0 (with Ray Fawkes, Kyle Higgins, and Aubrey Sitterson, April 2017)
 Magnus #1-#2 (with Kyle Higgins, June 2017 – July 2017)
 Turok #1-#4 (with Aubrey Sitterson, August 2017 – December 2017)

Marvel Comics 
 Hyperion #1-#6 (with Nik Virella, March 2016 – August 2016)
 Star Wars: The Force Awakens Adaptation #1-#6 (with Luke Ross, individual issues published June–November 2016, published in hardcover December 13, 2016, and in paperback November 21, 2017)

VS Comics 
 "Shackletoon’s Hooch" (with Gavin Mitchell, in VS Comics #9, one-shot, 2013)

Non-fiction 
 Confessions of a Freelance Penmonkey (2011)
 250 Things You Should Know About Writing (2011)
 Revenge of the Penmonkey (2011)
 500 Ways To Be a Better Writer (2011)
 500 More Ways To Be a Better Writer (2012)
 500 Ways To Tell a Better Story (2012)
 The Kickass Writer: 1001 Ways to Write Great Fiction, Get Published, and Earn Your Audience (2013)
 500 Ways To Write Harder (2014)
 30 Days In The Word Mines (2014)
 Damn Fine Story (2017)

Filmography

Reception
Aftermath debuted at No. 4 on The New York Times Best Seller list, and No. 4 on USA Today best seller list.

Wendig was a finalist for the John W. Campbell Award for Best New Writer in 2013.

References

External links 
 Terribleminds – Chuck Wendig's website
 
 
 
 Interview: Star Wars Author Chuck Wendig Talks Creating New Stories Within the Universe – The Portalist, 2016

1976 births
Living people
21st-century American novelists
21st-century American male writers
American comics writers
American male novelists
American science fiction writers
Marvel Comics writers
Marvel Comics people
Queens University of Charlotte alumni
Role-playing game designers
White Wolf game designers